
Gmina Jasieniec is a rural gmina (administrative district) in Grójec County, Masovian Voivodeship, in east-central Poland. Its seat is the village of Jasieniec, which lies approximately 7 kilometres (4 mi) south-east of Grójec and 46 km (28 mi) south of Warsaw.

Villages
Gmina Jasieniec contains the villages and settlements of Alfonsowo, Boglewice, Bronisławów, Czachów, Franciszków, Gołębiów, Gośniewice, Ignaców, Jasieniec, Koziegłowy, Kurczowa Wieś, Leżne, Łychów, Łychowska Wola, Michałówka, Miedzechów, Nowy Miedzechów, Olszany, Orzechowo, Osiny, Przydróżek, Ryszki, Rytomoczydła, Stefanków, Turowice, Turowice-Kolonia, Tworki, Warpęsy, Wierzchowina, Wola Boglewska and Zbrosza Duża.

Neighbouring gminas
Gmina Jasieniec is bordered by the gminas of Belsk Duży, Chynów, Goszczyn, Grójec, Promna and Warka.

References
Polish official population figures 2006

Jasieniec
Grójec County